is a dam in Kijō, Miyazaki Prefecture, Japan, completed in 2007.

References 

Dams in Miyazaki Prefecture
Dams completed in 2007